Ceratobiton is a monotypic genus of daesiid camel spiders, first described by Delle Cave and Simonetta in 1971. Its single species, Ceratobiton styloceros is distributed in Israel and Jordan.

References 

Solifugae
Arachnid genera
Monotypic arachnid genera